Club Wyndham South Pacific (formerly Wyndham Vacation Resorts Asia Pacific and Trendwest South Pacific) is a wholly owned subsidiary of Travel + Leisure Co. which operates as a vacation ownership, allowing vacationers to own real estate interest in one of the Wyndham resorts.

History

20th century
Wyndham Vacation Resorts Asia-Pacific was founded in November 1999 and opened its Corporate Offices at Bundall on Australia's Gold Coast in January 2000. Wyndham Vacation Resorts Asia Pacific opened its first South Pacific sales center at WorldMark Denarau Island, Fiji in March 2000. This was followed by sales centers at Upper Mount Gravatt & Lutwyche (Brisbane), Lane Cove, Parramatta (Sydney), Newcastle (NSW), Port Macquarie (NSW), Hawthorn and Doncaster (Melbourne), Kirra Beach (Gold Coast), and Auckland (New Zealand).

See also
 Wyndham Hotels and Resorts
 Resort Condominiums International, a timeshare company that is a division of Wyndham Destinations

References

External links
 WorldMark by Wyndham
 Club Wyndham South Pacific

Wyndham brands
Wyndham Destinations
Timeshare chains